Harold Wayne Hopp (born March 25, 1960 in Takoma Park, Maryland) is an American lawyer and judge from California.

Education
Hopp completed his undergraduate education at Pacific Union College in California's Napa Valley, graduating in 1983. He went on to receive his Juris Doctor from the University of Southern California Law School in 1986.

Legal career
After graduating from law school he served as an associate with Best, Best & Krieger and with the firm of Paul Hastings, Janofsky and Walker. He later served as Of Counsel for the law firm of Quinn, Emanuel, Urquhart, Oliver & Hedges from 1990 to 2005.

Judicial career
On May 16, 2005, then-Governor Arnold Schwarzenegger appointed Hopp to serve as a California Superior Court Judge in Riverside County.

References

1960 births
People from Takoma Park, Maryland
Pacific Union College alumni
20th-century American lawyers
21st-century American lawyers
21st-century American judges
California lawyers
Living people
American jurists
USC Gould School of Law alumni